Vesa Luma  is a Kosovo-Albanian singer and songwriter. She has participated in many children’s festivals and song contests as a singer. At the same time, from the age of 8, she studied flute and vocal. Since completing her Music Professional School in Kosovo, Vesa has participated in the television series “Pop Idol". She was very successful at the contest, making it to the TOP 3 in live final shows. After the "Ethet", Vesa's career began to grow. She has released 2 studio albums, 19 music videos, more than 20 music awards in her country and more than 200 concerts around the world. She has also contributed to various charities. After a very successful career, Vesa was chosen to be a Judge and mentor on the well known TV series of “X Factor” in Albania. She was also part of the “Dancing with the Stars”. Besides her music career, Vesa has also had a career in the Television Industry. She was a TV Presenter, for several years, and produced her own Tv Show in Kosovo.  

She had been a judge on the first series of The X Factor (Albania) which began on 8 January 2012.

See also
Rona Nishliu

External links
 Vesa Luma biography
 Biographical information and gallery (in Albanian)
 Lyrics

References

1986 births
Living people
21st-century Albanian women singers
Kosovan singers